A grandstand is a large and normally permanent structure for seating spectators.

Grandstand may also refer to:

Television and radio
 Grandstand (TV programme), a 1958–2007 British television sports programme
 GrandStand (NFL on NBC pregame show), 1975–1976
 ABC Radio Grandstand, an Australian radio sports show

Other uses
 Grandstand (US Open), a tennis court at the USTA Billie Jean King National Tennis Center, New York City, U.S.
 Grandstand (game manufacturer), a UK/New Zealand console and game manufacturer
 The Grandstand, a natural rock monolith in Death Valley National Park, California, U.S.
 Political grandstanding, also known as Political posturing, the use of speech or actions to gain political support through emotional or affective appeals.